The Cheekye Fan is a large landslide feature in southwestern British Columbia, Canada, at the head of Howe Sound. It formed by collapse on the west flank of the volcano Mount Garibaldi, which was constructed over a glacier during the Late Pleistocene period.

References

Landslides in Canada
Natural disasters in British Columbia
Garibaldi Volcanic Belt
Pleistocene events